Yoon Mun-sik (born 1943) is a South Korean actor. Joong-Ang Magazine ranked him as the Korea's most powerful theatrical person. His stage and subsequent film career spanned a total of 40 years, during which he made about 40 musical films and 19 movies.

According to actress Kim Sung-nyeo, "The history of Korean theatrical performance begins with Yoon Mun-sik."

Life and career
Yoon was born in Seosan, Chungcheongnam-do.

References

Living people
1943 births
People from South Chungcheong Province
South Korean male film actors
South Korean male television actors
South Korean male stage actors
South Korean Buddhists